Shaghun (also Romanized as Shāghūn) is a village in Pol Beh Pain Rural District, Simakan District, Jahrom County, Fars Province, Iran. At the 2006 census, its population was 733, in 147 families.

References 

Populated places in Jahrom County